Michele Tito (18 June 1920 – 11 January 1961) was an Italian athlete who competed mainly in the 100 metres.

Biography
He was born in Trieste and competed for an Italy in the 1948 Summer Olympics held in London, Great Britain in the 4 x 100 metre relay where he won the bronze medal with his team mates Enrico Perucconi, Antonio Siddi and Carlo Monti.

Olympic results

See also
 Italy national relay team

References

External links
 

1920 births
1968 deaths
Sportspeople from Trieste
Italian male sprinters
Olympic bronze medalists for Italy
Athletes (track and field) at the 1948 Summer Olympics
Olympic athletes of Italy
Medalists at the 1948 Summer Olympics
Olympic bronze medalists in athletics (track and field)